Peter Akerovych; (b ? d ?) — was an Eastern Orthodox metropolitan from Kyiv (official title — Metropolitan of Kyiv and All-Rus').

Metropolitan of Kyiv from 1241 to 1245, descendant of a boyar family. He was hegumen of the Saint Saviour Monastery in Berestove and since 1240 - an Orthodox bishop.

Akerovych participated in the First Council of Lyon in 1245, where he informed the Catholic West of the Tatar threat. And was employed by Grand Prince of Kyiv Mykhailo Vsevolodovych in diplomatic service.

Nothing is known of Akerovych past the year 1246.

References 
 Akerovych, Petro at the Encyclopedia of Ukraine

Metropolitans of Kiev and all Rus' (988–1441)
13th-century Eastern Orthodox bishops
13th-century births
13th-century deaths